The 1999 All Japan Grand Touring Car Championship was the seventh season of Japan Automobile Federation GT premiere racing. It was marked as well as the seventeenth season of a JAF-sanctioned sports car racing championship dating back to the All Japan Sports Prototype Championship. The GT500 class champion of that season was the Pennzoil Nismo GT-R driven by Érik Comas and Satoshi Motoyama and the GT300 class champion was the MOMOCORSE A'PEX MR2 driven by Morio Nitta and Shinichi Takagi. Both Comas and Nitta won their respective driver's title on their own since Motoyama and Takagi missed a round each; Motoyama skipped the second round at Fuji because he was participating in the pre-qualifying session of that year's 24 Hours of Le Mans while Takagi missed the first round at Suzuka because he was in the United States on a bid to find a seat in Indy Lights. 

The season was marred by the death of reigning GT300 Champion, Shingo Tachi, in a pre-season testing crash at TI Circuit Aida on March 11, 1999. Tachi was to drive the number 6 Esso Toyota Supra for Toyota Team LeMans. Kunimitsu Takahashi retired from his racing career at the end of the season at aged 59.

Schedule

Season results

Point Ranking

GT500

Drivers

GT300 Class (Top 5)

Drivers

References

External links
 Super GT/JGTC official race archive 

Super GT seasons
JGTC